The 1960 UCLA Bruins football team was an American football team that represented the University of California, Los Angeles (UCLA) as a member of the Athletic Association of Western Universities (AAWU) during the 1960 NCAA University Division football season. In their third-year under head coach William F. Barnes, the Bruins compiled an overall record of 7–2–1 record with a mark of 2–2 in conference play, placing third in the AAWU.

UCLA's offensive leaders in 1960 were quarterback Billy Kilmer with 1,086 passing yards each, Kilmer with 803 rushing yards, and Gene Gaines with 258 receiving yards.

Schedule

Roster
 QB Billy Kilmer, Sr.

References

UCLA
UCLA Bruins football seasons
UCLA Bruins football
UCLA Bruins football